"Downtown Train" is a song by Tom Waits released on his album Rain Dogs in 1985. The promo video for the song was directed by Jean-Baptiste Mondino and features boxer Jake LaMotta.

Rod Stewart version

British singer Rod Stewart recorded a cover version that became a number-three hit on the Billboard Hot 100 chart after being released as a single in late 1989, and was also a number-one single on the album rock and adult contemporary charts. The song went to number one in Canada and made the top ten on the UK Singles Chart in 1990. Stewart received a Grammy nomination for the song in the category Best Male Pop Vocal performance. Stewart's cover featured the slide guitar playing of Jeff Beck.

Other recordings
Bob Seger also recorded a version of "Downtown Train" in 1989 before Rod Stewart recorded his version. Seger claimed that on a trip to London he told Rod Stewart he had recorded a version of "Downtown Train" and then one month later Rod Stewart recorded his version. Rod Stewart and his management have denied that Rod Stewart stole the idea from Bob Seger. Seger decided not to release his version in 1989 as originally planned but instead re-recorded it in 2011 for his album Ultimate Hits: Rock and Roll Never Forgets.

Patty Smyth also released a version in 1987 that reached number 95 on the Billboard Hot 100.

Everything but the Girl recorded a version of the song that appears on the albums Acoustic and Essence & Rare 82-92, both released in 1992. It featured in the series finale of How I Met Your Mother.

Personnel
 Tom Waits – vocals, guitar
 Michael Blair – percussion
 Robert Quine – guitar
 G. E. Smith – guitar
 Mickey Curry – drums
 Tony Levin – bass
 Robby Kilgore – organ

Charts

Patty Smyth version

Rod Stewart version

Weekly charts

Year-end charts

Bob Seger version

Weekly charts

Year-end charts

See also
List of RPM number-one singles of 1990
List of number-one adult contemporary singles of 1990 (U.S.)
List of Billboard Mainstream Rock number-one songs of the 1990s
List of train songs

References

External links
 [ AllMusic.com track review]

1987 singles
1989 singles
2011 singles
Patty Smyth songs
Rod Stewart songs
Bob Seger songs
Cashbox number-one singles
RPM Top Singles number-one singles
Song recordings produced by Trevor Horn
Songs written by Tom Waits
Songs about trains
1985 songs
Tom Waits songs
Music videos directed by Jean-Baptiste Mondino
Island Records singles